The 2021–22 season was the 87th season in the existence of RCD Espanyol and the club's first season back in the top flight of Spanish football. In addition to the domestic league, Espanyol participated in this season's edition of the Copa del Rey.

Players

First-team squad

Out on loan

Reserve team

Transfers

In

Out

Pre-season and friendlies

Competitions

Overall record

La Liga

League table

Results summary

Results by round

Matches
The league fixtures were announced on 30 June 2021.

Copa del Rey

Statistics

Appearances and goals
Last updated 22 May 2022

|-
! colspan=14 style=background:#dcdcdc; text-align:center|Goalkeepers

|-
! colspan=14 style=background:#dcdcdc; text-align:center|Defenders

|-
! colspan=14 style=background:#dcdcdc; text-align:center|Midfielders

|-
! colspan=14 style=background:#dcdcdc; text-align:center|Forwards

|-
! colspan=14 style=background:#dcdcdc; text-align:center| Players who have made an appearance or had a squad number this season but have left the club

|}

Goalscorers

References

RCD Espanyol seasons
RCD Espanyol